Cuppy's Coffee & More, Inc. was a privately owned specialty coffee franchise.  Cuppy's, along with Java Jo'z national chain folded in 2009. However, former franchisees still continue to use the name in their shops.

Corporation
Cuppy's Coffee & More, Inc., a Texas corporation, was formed in July 2006. It is owned by Dale Nabors, who owns its parent company Medina Management and FranSynergy, Inc. successor-in-interest to Elite. According to unhappyfranchisee.com, Cuppy's has been accused of fraud in its dealings with potential franchisees. The issue was complicated in May 2009 when Nabors was arrested in Alabama on charges of fraud and warrant for his arrest for similar charges was issued in Florida. Cuppy’s Coffee, Smoothies & More, Inc. announced a record year of growth in 2007 marked by the opening of 33 stores and the signing of franchise agreements for more than 200 locations to open in 2008.

See also

 List of coffeehouse chains

References 

Coffeehouses and cafés in the United States
Fast-food chains of the United States
Companies based in Florida
Regional restaurant chains in the United States
Defunct restaurant chains in the United States
Restaurant franchises